Philosophy: The Best of Bill Hicks is a compilation album of routines by the American stand-up comedian and satirist Bill Hicks, released by Rykodisc in 2001.

Track listing
 "Greetings" (1:16)
 "Flying Saucer Tour" (3:19)
 "Please Do Not Disturb" (6:58)
 "Gays in the Military" (2:27)
 "Smoking" (5:31)
 "Great Times on Drugs" (10:46)
 "Sex on Trial" (3:07)
 "What Is Pornography?" (3:33)
 "Save Willie" (1:06)
 "Confession Time (Cops)" (4:24)
 "Step on the Gas (L.A. Riots)" (4:49)
 "Hooligans" (3:58)
 "Politics in America" (0:38)
 "The Elite" (1:03)
 "Time to Evolve" (2:58)
 "Odd Beliefs" (0:48)
 "Dinosaurs in the Bible" (5:56)
 "Easter" (1:18)
 "Gideons" (1:04)
 "Your Children Aren't Special" (3:16)
 "The Sanctity of Life" (2:58)

Notes and references

Bill Hicks albums
2001 compilation albums
Compilation albums published posthumously
Rykodisc compilation albums
2000s comedy albums
Comedy compilation albums
Live comedy albums
Spoken word albums by American artists
Live spoken word albums
Stand-up comedy albums